Affligem (anciently written Afflighem) is a municipality located some  west-north-west of Brussels in the Belgian province of Flemish Brabant, not far from the city of Aalst and the important railway junction of Denderleeuw. Affligem is situated in the Pajottenland.

The municipality comprises the villages of Essene, Hekelgem and Teralfene (note that there is no village called Affligem proper). On 1 January 2006 it had 11,956 inhabitants.

Historically, the village is best known for the Benedictine Affligem Abbey, founded in 1062.

Affligem abbey beers

The abbey of Affligem was founded around 1074, making it one of the oldest breweries and businesses in Belgium. The label "anno 1074" on the Affligem beer bottles is based on Abbey's founding. The brand name is used under license from the monks of Affligem, by the Op-Ale brewery in the neighbouring village of Opwijk. The brewery is now owned by Heineken International, who have renamed it the Affligem brewery and market the beers internationally.

References

External links and sources

Affligem Municipality Official site 

 
Municipalities of Flemish Brabant